Private Beach Party is a 1985 studio album by the Jamaican reggae singer Gregory Isaacs. The album continued Isaacs' working relationship with producer Augustus "Gussie" Clarke, to whom he would return in 1988 for the hugely successful "Rumours" and Red Rose for Gregory. Clarke employed Carlton Hines to write several of the songs on the album, and the musicians featured include Sly Dunbar, Robbie Shakespeare, Lloyd Parks, and Willie Lindo.

The album features duets with Carlene Davis (on "Feeling Irie") and Dennis Brown (on "Let off Supm").

Originally released by Greensleeves Records in 1985, it was released in the US by Ras Records.

Reception
Allmusic's Jo-Ann Greene called the album a "masterpiece", stating "There's not a mis-step within the entire set, and every song is so high-caliber that's it's useless to try to pick favorites". Robert Christgau rated the album B+, commenting "there's a light touch to this music--Isaacs whispering and murmuring around diffident horn-section filigrees--that I'd call sexy". Trouser Press described Private Beach Party as "his best album in years — a fresh, diverse package". Steve Barrow & Peter Dalton selected the album as one of their recommendations in The Rough Guide to Reggae, calling the duet with Davis "outstanding".

Track listing
All tracks composed by Carlton "Tetrack" Hines; except where noted
"Private Beach Party" (Hines, Willie Lindo)
"Wish You Were Mine" (Gregory Isaacs)
"Feeling Irie" - Gregory Isaacs & Carlene Davis
"Bits and Pieces"
"Let Off Supm" - Gregory Isaacs & Dennis Brown
"No Rushings" (Phipps)
"Better Plant Some Loving"
"Special to Me" (Lloyd Forest, Willie Lindo)
"Got to Be in Tune"
"Promise Is a Comfort"

Personnel
Gregory Isaacs - vocals
Lloyd Parks - bass guitar
Robbie Shakespeare - bass guitar
Sly Dunbar - drums
Willie Stewart - drums
Willie Lindo - guitar, arrangements
Robert Lyn - piano, synthesizer
Franklyn "Bubbler" Waul - piano, synthesizer
Lloyd Forest - backing vocals
David Harvey - backing vocals
Carlton Hines - backing vocals
Dean Fraser - horns
David Madden - horns
Ronald "Nambo" Robinson - horns
Rass Brass - horns
Junior "Chico" Chin - horns
Carlene Davis - vocals
Dennis Brown - vocals

References

1985 albums
Gregory Isaacs albums
Greensleeves Records albums